WorldView-2 (WV 2) is a commercial Earth observation satellite owned by DigitalGlobe. WorldView-2 provides commercially available panchromatic imagery of  resolution, and eight-band multispectral imagery with  resolution.

It was launched 8 October 2009 to become DigitalGlobe's third satellite in orbit, joining WorldView-1 which was launched in 2007 and QuickBird which was launched in 2001. It takes a new photograph of any place on Earth every 1.1 days.

Design
Ball Aerospace built the spacecraft, which includes an optical telescope that can image objects  in diameter.

Launch
WorldView-2 was launched 8 October 2009 from Vandenberg Air Force Base on a Delta II flying in the 7920 configuration. The launch vehicle was provided by the United Launch Alliance and launch services were administered by Boeing.

History
On 19 July 2016, the Joint Space Operations Center reported a debris causing event of at least 9 observable pieces, after which DigitalGlobe demonstrated the satellite to still be functional by releasing an image of downtown Oakland, California.

See also

 2009 in spaceflight

References

External links
 WorldView-2 at Digitalglobe.com
 WorldView-2 sensor information at Satimagingcorp.com

Commercial imaging satellites of the United States
Spacecraft launched in 2009
Spacecraft launched by Delta II rockets